Dana J. Weigel became a flight director at NASA in 2005. She has also been leading the research on Space Shuttle repair methods in order to prevent disasters during reentry back to earth. She also supervised Extravehicular Activity (EVA) on STS-109. She is a 1993 graduate of Texas A&M University.

Awards or recognition 

 2007 Rotary National Award for Space Achievement Foundation Stellar Award Winner-Early Career (for individuals up to age 33). For a history of strong technical ability and leadership resulting in her selection as a flight director in 2005, where she immediately began leading Mission Control in critical activities.
 2000 Rotary National Award for Space Achievement Foundation Stellar Award Winner-Recent Graduate. For outstanding dedication, professionalism, and technical excellence in developing the Extra-Vehicular Activity procedures and conducting crew training for the successful third Hubble Space Telescope servicing mission.

References 

Living people
NASA people
Texas A&M University alumni
Year of birth missing (living people)